The Day may refer to:

Film and television
 The Day (1914 film), an Australian silent film
 The Day (1960 film), a short film
 The Day (2011 film), a Canadian film
 The Day (2022 film), a Bangladeshi–Iran joint production film
 The Day, a television news program produced by Deutsche Welle

Music
 The Day (EP), a 2015 EP by Day6
 The Day (album), a 1996 album by Babyface
 The Day, a 2000 album by Reckless Kelly

 "The Day" (Moby song), 2011
 "The Day" (K.Will and Baekhyun song), 2016
 "The Day", a song by They Might Be Giants from the album They Might Be Giants, 1986

News media
 The Day (New London), a Connecticut, US newspaper founded in 1881
 The Day (website), British news website for schoolchildren
 The Day (Kyiv), a Kyiv, Ukraine newspaper founded in 1996

Other
 Yoma, "The Day" in Aramaic, the fifth tractate of Seder Moed ("Order of Festivals") of the Mishnah and of the Talmud

See also
 
 
 Day (disambiguation)
 The Days (disambiguation)